What a Diff'rence a Day Makes! is a tenth studio album by Dinah Washington, arranged by Belford Hendricks, featuring her hit single of the same name.

The title track won Washington the Grammy Award for Best R&B Performance at the 2nd Annual Grammy Awards held in November 1959.

Album was released on CD in 2000 on the Verve label with 3 bonus tracks.

Track listing
 "I Remember You" (Johnny Mercer, Victor Schertzinger) – 2:42
 "I Thought About You"  (Jimmy Van Heusen, Johnny Mercer) – 2:28
 "That's All There Is to That" (Clyde Otis, Kelly Owens) – 2:15
 "I Won't Cry Anymore" (Al Frisch, Fred Wise) – 2:15
 "I'm Thru with Love" (Gus Kahn, Fud Livingston, Matty Malneck) – 2:23
 "Cry Me a River" (Arthur Hamilton) – 2:24
 "What a Diff'rence a Day Makes" (Stanley Adams, María Mendez Grever) – 2:35
 "Nothing in the World" (Brook Benton, Belford Hendricks, Clyde Otis) – 3:12
 "Manhattan" (Richard Rodgers, Lorenz Hart) – 4:13
 "Time after Time" (Sammy Cahn, Jule Styne) – 2:27
 "It's Magic" (Sammy Cahn, Jule Styne) – 2:28
 "A Sunday Kind of Love" (Barbara Belle, Anita Leonard, Louis Prima, Stan Rhodes) – 2:26
 "Time after Time" (First Version) (Sammy Cahn, Jule Styne) - 2:15
  "Come On Home" (Bonus) (Juanita Hill, Dinah Washington) - 2:27
 "It Could Happen To You" (Bonus) (Jimmy Van Heusen, Johnny Burke) - 2:19

Personnel

Performance

 Dinah Washington - vocals
 Charles Davis - baritone saxophone
 Jerome Richardson - flute
 Kenny Burrell - guitar
 David "Panama" Francis - drums
 Milt Hinton - double bass
 Joe Zawinul - piano
 Belford Hendricks - arranger, conductor

Production

 Tom Greenwood - research coordination
 Carlos Kase
 Hollis King - art direction
 Edward Odowd - design
 Sherniece Smith - art producer
 Chuck Stewart - photography
 Bruce Swedien - sound engineer

References

1959 albums
Dinah Washington albums
Mercury Records albums
Albums conducted by Belford Hendricks
Albums arranged by Belford Hendricks